In the 2015–16 season, MC Alger competed in the Ligue 1 for the 45th season, as well as the Algerian Cup.

Competitions

Overview

Ligue 1

League table

Results summary

Results by round

Matches

Algerian Cup

Squad information

Playing statistics

|-

|-
! colspan=14 style=background:#dcdcdc; text-align:center| Players transferred out during the season

Goalscorers

Players

Transfers

In

Out

References

MC Alger seasons
Algerian football clubs 2015–16 season